Argentinísima  (English language:) is a 1972  Argentine musical documentary film directed by Fernando Ayala and Héctor Olivera written by Félix Luna. The film premiered on 8 July 1972 in Buenos Aires.

The film consists of musical performances, mostly Argentine folklore, many of which are accompanied by dancing. Several sequences were filmed in scenic locations throughout the country.

Argentinísima II was released the following year in 1973.

Cast
Santiago Ayala
Jorge Cafrune
Los Chalchaleros
Tránsito Cocomarola
Jovita Díaz
Eduardo Falú
Ramona Galarza
Horacio Guarany
Nélida Lobato
Julio Marbíz
Ástor Piazzolla
Los Quilla-Huasi
Ariel Ramírez
Mercedes Sosa
Norma Viola
Atahualpa Yupanqui

External links
 

1972 films
1970s Spanish-language films
Argentine documentary films
Films directed by Fernando Ayala
Films directed by Héctor Olivera
1970s musical films
1972 documentary films
Documentary films about music and musicians
Argentine music
1970s Argentine films